The Scottish Association for Marine Science (SAMS) is one of Europe's leading marine science research organisations, one of the oldest oceanographic organisations in the world and is Scotland's largest and oldest independent marine science organisation.

Sited on the Dunstaffnage peninsula, beside Dunstaffnage Castle and near Oban, Argyll on the Scottish west coast, SAMS marine research and teaching portfolio is diverse in topic and discipline, global in outlook and relevance, and delivered in partnership with academic, business, government, regulatory, voluntary and civic society colleagues.

Advanced research is carried out in the marine environment, including polar research in the Arctic and Antarctic, climate change and marine biological research.

SAMS is an academic partner of the University of the Highlands and Islands and delivers  BSc, Masters and doctorate] programmes in the marine science field. It is also a member of the Marine Alliance for Science and Technology for Scotland (MASTS), and one of its staff is the director of the Scottish Alliance for Geoscience, Environment and Society (SAGES).

History
The Association was founded in 1884 by Sir John Murray following the landmark Challenger expedition. The Scottish Marine Station, as it was then known, was established in Granton outside Edinburgh and was the first marine research station in Scotland. It grew quickly and over the next 10 years began a gradual transfer of activities to Millport on the isle of Cumbrae on the west coast. In 1894 a local committee undertook fundraising in order to construct a building onshore. This station, situated near Keppel Pier, was completed in 1897. In 1901 the committee transformed itself into the Marine Biological Association of the West of Scotland by adopting a formal constitution. In 1914 the association was incorporated as a not-for-profit company and renamed the Scottish Marine Biological Association.

After 80 years of investigations of the Firth of Clyde area and an island location, the Association relocated to the mainland in 1967 and built new facilities near Oban where it has easy access to a variety of oceanographic environments. In 1992 the Association was renamed as the Scottish Association for Marine Science.

The research laboratories at Dunstaffnage were rebuilt and re-equipped in 2004 and new teaching facilities were provided in 2010. The Ocean Explorer Centre, at Dunbeg, allows visitors to learn about the marine environment and the academic research going on at SAMS.

In 2014 the Ocean Explorer Centre was opened by Michael Russell MSP, then Scottish Cabinet Secretary for Education and Lifelong Learning, to serve as a visitor and outreach facility for SAMS.

Research
SAMS science focuses on three major and urgent challenges which humankind and our natural world must face:

 to discover the physical, chemical, geological and biological processes that drive the marine system so that we have the knowledge needed
 to describe and quantify how our coastal environment, where more than half the human population resides, responds to ever-increasing man-made pressures such as climate change, habitat destruction, pollution and resource overexploitation and to work with society on developing and testing mitigation and adaptation measures and finally
 to develop a sustainable blue economy so that we can use the marine environment for the benefit of people without degrading its health and productivity
 to address these major challenges SAMS science is multi-disciplinary, drawing on the expertise from physicists, mathematicians, biologists, geologists, chemists, social scientists, computer scientists, technologists, engineers and communicators.

In addition to marine research, in the fields of marine processes and climate change, renewable energy, the Arctic, marine prosperity and sustainability, and mining impacts, the institute has a commercial branch and an education department.

Business 
SAMS Research Services Ltd (SRSL) is the wholly owned trading subsidiary of SAMS and is also based at the Scottish Marine Institute, Dunstaffange. SRSL has been a part of the SAMS Group since 2002. The subsidiary delivers specialist marine consultancy and survey services, underpinned by the scientific research taking place at the research institute. SRSL aims to mitigate the risks involved in industry interaction with the marine environment, while promoting sustainable and productive oceans. SRSL provides environmental services to multiple industries, including aquaculture, renewable energy, marine mining, oil & gas (decommissioning), seafood security and marine biotechnology. The company also manufactures devices for autonomous snow and ice measurement used in polar environments.

Facilities

Robotics facility

Using a multitude of flying and diving robots, the experienced and skilled staff and students at SAMS' Scottish Marine Robotics Facility develop, adapt, deploy and operate latest smart technologies to answer pressing environmental science questions. These new technologies drive marine science forward and the new knowledge enables people to plan how we interact with the marine realm more sustainably. The facility has an exceptional range of capabilities that support academic, regulatory and commercial projects. From aerial mapping to surface fluxes and the properties of deep water, the Scottish Marine Robotics Facility has technologies that span the atmosphere, ocean and ice.

Culture Collection of Algae and Protozoa 
The CCAP is the most diverse collection of algae and protists in Europe. It supports SAMS' research, currently with a focus on algal diseases

Education

SAMS offers students a complete educational pathway from undergraduate through to PhD studies.

Undergraduate
Undergraduate studies at SAMS offer three Bachelor's degree options to incoming students:
 Marine Science BSc (Hons)
 Marine Science with Arctic Studies BSc
 Marine Science with Oceanography & Marine Robotics BSc

Postgraduate
Postgraduate studies at SAMS offer three master-s degree options for incoming students:

Aquaculture, Environment and Society (ACES) Joint Masters (Erasmus Mundus) 
Algal Biotechnology, Biology and Ecology MRes

PhD
SAMS offer differing PhD studentships over the course of the year when projects or funding becomes available. There is also the opportunity for students who want to self-fund a PhD project.

References

External links

 Ocean Explorer Centre

Oceanographic organizations
Scientific organisations based in the United Kingdom
Science and technology in Scotland
Organisations based in Argyll and Bute
1884 establishments in Scotland
University of the Highlands and Islands
Scientific organizations established in 1884
Scottish coast